İpek Öz (born 8 July 1999) is a Turkish tennis player.

She has a career-high singles ranking of world No. 164, achieved on 27 June 2022. On 13 June 2022, she peaked at No. 327 in WTA the doubles rankings. She took part in the 2018 Mediterranean Games in Tarragona, Spain, and won the gold medal for Turkey in the doubles event, alongside teammate Başak Eraydın.

Career
Öz won her first professional title in the singles event at the ITF tournament held at Manavgat, Turkey in 2017, defeating four different opponents from Czechia, Belgium, Brazil and Italy, and Ilona Georgiana Ghioroaie from Romania in the final.

Öz made her WTA Tour main-draw debut at the 2018 İstanbul Cup, where she received a wildcard into the singles draw, and in the doubles main draw, partnering Melis Sezer.

Grand Slam performance

Singles

ITF Circuit finals

Singles: 13 (4 titles, 9 runner–ups)

Doubles: 22 (9 titles, 13 runner–ups)

Other finals

Doubles

Notes

References

External links
 
 
 

1999 births
Living people
Turkish female tennis players
Competitors at the 2018 Mediterranean Games
Mediterranean Games gold medalists for Turkey
Mediterranean Games medalists in tennis
Sportspeople from Antalya
21st-century Turkish sportswomen